The Middlesex Fells Reservation Parkways are the roadways within and bordering on the Middlesex Fells Reservation, a state park in the northern suburbs of Boston, Massachusetts.  The park includes portions of the towns of Malden, Medford, Melrose, Stoneham, and Winchester. The roads inside the park and around its perimeter have been listed on the National Register of Historic Places.  Other portions of some of the roads are covered by more than one listing in the national register; see Fellsway Connector Parkways and Middlesex Fells Reservoirs Historic District.

The Middlesex Fells Reservation is one of the oldest and largest of the parks in the Metropolitan Park System of Greater Boston. This area included some existing roadways, which became internal roadways of the park. The border roads that surround the park followed a principle articulated by landscape designer Charles Eliot, who was instrumental in the preservation of the Fells, that such roads clearly delineated the bounds of the park, and provided its neighbors with pleasing views.

Border parkways
The parkways are described here in clockwise order, beginning in the south.

South Border Road
South Border Road runs from Roosevelt Circle, a major interchange including Interstate 93 and Fellsway West (Massachusetts Route 28) in Medford, along the southwestern border of the reservation, northwest into Winchester, where it ends at a junction that includes Highland Avenue, a noncontributing road that borders the reservation on the west, and the Mystic Valley Parkway, a parkway that joins the reservation to the DCR lands of the Mystic River Reservation.  There are small, mostly unpaved, parking areas on the reservation side of the road providing access to trails.  There is a small dead-end spur of the road that resulted from the construction of I-93, and there is a roughly  section which runs inside the reservation as a result of land acquisitions south of the road.

Hillcrest Parkway
Hillcrest Parkway is a U-shaped road, both of whose ends are on Highland Avenue in Winchester. The west side of the parkway (the inside of the U) consists of residential properties, most of which were developed in the early 20th century; the reservation is to the east. There is a scenic view of the North Reservoir near its northern end. The Near this point there was formerly a junction with a North Border Road, which has been fragmented and rerouted in part by the construction of I-93 and partially converted to hiking trails, and is not considered part of the National Register listing.

South Street and Pond Street
There is a grassy area, including a parking area, that provides fine views of Spot Pond, along this stretch of road. A non-park portion of Pond Street extends north toward the center of Stoneham, while the parkway section extends south into the interior of the park, flanking the eastern shore of Spot Pond. At its junction with Woodland Road it runs eastward to a junction with Fellsway East and the Lynn Fells Parkway, the latter a connecting parkway joining the Fells to the Breakheart Reservation. The section along the pond is four lanes wide, with opposing travel lanes separated by a wide grassy median.

Fellsway East

The northernmost section of Fellsway East runs either within or on the border of the Fells.  From the junction with Pond Street in Stoneham, it runs south, forming a small miter (triangular) junction with Ravine Road, before passing, shortly afterward entering Melrose.  After it passes Washington Street, a municipal road heading southeast, it passes through a heavily wooded section of the park before reaching its junction with the East Border Road in Malden.  The roadway continues south from this junction as a connecting parkway.

East Border Road
East Border Road runs west from its junction with Summer Street, a Malden municipal street, through the intersection with Fellsway East, along the heavily wooded southern flank of the park, to a junction with Highland Avenue, a municipal street in Medford.  A short stretch of Highland runs north along the park border to a circular intersection with Woodland Road and Elm Street; this stretch of Highland is not part of the National Register listing.

Elm Street
Elm Street continues to follow the southern flank of the park westward from the junction with Woodland Road and East Border Road, running west to a junction with Fellsway West.  There is a parking area, with access to Wright's Pond, on this stretch of road.

Fellsway West

Fellsway West is partly a border parkway and partly internal; the border section of the parkway connects Elm Street to Roosevelt Circle. The internal section provides access to some centrally located reservation resources; the historic border section now consists of a one-way stretch of road that runs from the northeast side of Roosevelt Circle, while a modern one-way section runs south from the Elm Street junction, over I-93, to join Roosevelt Circle at the northwest, near the junction with South Border Road.

Interior parkways
The interior parkways (excluding portions of the border roads that run through parts of the reservation) are described roughly from east to west.

Ravine Road
Ravine Road is a relatively short roadway connecting Woodland Road in the west to Fellsway East. The ravine for which it is named contains Spot Pond Brook, and lies just to the north, but is not visible from the roadway.

Woodland Road
Woodland Road is one of the two major north–south parkways through the reservation.  It is a four-lane roadway with a grassy median for most of its length, running south from South Street in Stoneham to a junction with Elm Street and Highland Avenue in Medford.  Its major intersections are designed as small rotaries, and it provides access to the Spot Pond area, the visitor center at the John Bottume House, and the Metropolitan District Commission Pumping House.

Fellsway West
The interior reservation parkway portion of Fellsway West runs north from the junction with Elm Street in Medford to a junction with North Border Road and South Street in Stoneham.  Because it has been significantly altered by the construction of adjacent I-93, most of this portion of parkway is not included in the National Register listing.  The parkway provides access to the most centrally-located parking area of the reservation, the Lower Sheepfold lot.

See also
 Middlesex Fells Reservoirs Historic District
 Fells Connector Parkways, which connect the Middlesex Fells Reservation to the Mystic River Reservation
 Lynn Fells Parkway, which connects the reservation to the Breakheart Reservation
 National Register of Historic Places listings in Middlesex County, Massachusetts

References

Stoneham, Massachusetts
Winchester, Massachusetts
Melrose, Massachusetts
Malden, Massachusetts
Transportation in Medford, Massachusetts
Roads on the National Register of Historic Places in Massachusetts
Parkways in Massachusetts
National Register of Historic Places in Middlesex County, Massachusetts
Historic districts on the National Register of Historic Places in Massachusetts
Parks on the National Register of Historic Places in Massachusetts
National Register of Historic Places in Winchester, Massachusetts
National Register of Historic Places in Stoneham, Massachusetts
National Register of Historic Places in Medford, Massachusetts